Briarwood, also known as Bingham House, is a historic home located at Virginia Beach, Virginia.  It was built in 1932, and is a two-story, 6,000 square foot, Tudor Revival style brick dwelling. It features steeply pitched gabled and hipped roof elements clad in historic slate shingles as well as three corbelled brick chimneys.

It was added to the National Register of Historic Places in 2012.

References

Houses on the National Register of Historic Places in Virginia
Tudor Revival architecture in Virginia
Houses completed in 1932
Houses in Virginia Beach, Virginia
National Register of Historic Places in Virginia Beach, Virginia